Constant Villegas is a French professional rugby league footballer who currently plays for Villeneuve XIII in the Elite One Championship. He previously played for Toulouse Olympique. He is a France international.

He was named in the France training squad for the 2008 Rugby League World Cup.

Villegas represented France in the 2009 Four Nations tournament.

References

External links
Toulouse Olympique profile
Great Britain 42-14 France

1986 births
Living people
France national rugby league team players
French rugby league players
Rugby league halfbacks
Toulouse Olympique players
Villeneuve Leopards players